Prochoerodes forficaria is a species of geometrid moth in the family Geometridae. It is found in North America.

The MONA or Hodges number for Prochoerodes forficaria is 6981.

References

Further reading

External links

 

Ourapterygini
Articles created by Qbugbot
Moths described in 1858